The 2015 Jacksonville State Gamecocks football team represented Jacksonville State University as a member of the Ohio Valley Conference (OVC) during the 2015 NCAA Division I FCS football season. Led by second-year head coach John Grass, the Gamecocks compiled an overall record of 13–2 with a mark of 8–0 in conference play, winning the OVC title for the second consecutive season. Jacksonville State received the OVC's automatic bid to the NCAA Division I Football Championship playoffs. After a first-round bye, the Gamecocks defeated Chattanooga in the second round, Charleston Southern in the quarterfinals, and Sam Houston State in the semifinals before losing to North Dakota State in the NCAA Division I Championship Game. The team played home games at Burgess–Snow Field at JSU Stadium in Jacksonville, Alabama.

Schedule

Game summaries

@ Chattanooga

@ Auburn

Tennessee State

@ UT Martin

Mississippi Valley State

@ Tennessee Tech

@ Austin Peay

Eastern Kentucky

@ Eastern Illinois

Southeast Missouri State

Murray State

Chattanooga—NCAA Division I First Round

Charleston Southern—NCAA Division I Quarterfinal

Sam Houston State—NCAA Division I Semifinal

North Dakota State—NCAA Division I Championship Game

Ranking movements

References

Jacksonville State
Jacksonville State Gamecocks football seasons
Ohio Valley Conference football champion seasons
Jacksonville State
Jacksonville State Gamecocks football